Dasychirinula is a monotypic moth genus in the family Lasiocampidae first described by Erich Martin Hering in 1926. Its only species, Dasychirinula chrysogramma, described in the same publication, is found in Kenya.

References

Endemic moths of Kenya
Lasiocampidae
Monotypic moth genera